Farewell Baghdad is a 2010 Iranian drama film directed by Mehdi Naderi. The film was selected as the Iranian entry for the Best Foreign Language Film at the 83rd Academy Awards, but did not make the final shortlist.

Plot
The Polish-American boxer Daniel Dalca (Mazdak Mirabedini) escapes his problems by enlisting in the army. After four years when his mission is over, he is sent back home where he would have to face his past problems. So he decides to desert the army. In the middle of a desert he gets bitten by a scorpion.

On the very day of her marriage, 29 March 2003, Rebecca (Pantea Bahram) lost her husband during the British-American attack on Iraq. Today she is managing a little restaurant on the Iraqi borderline where she hosts Iraqi and American soldiers. She goes to the landmines to clear mines in order to plant trees and palms at the very same places.

Saleh Al Marzouk (Mostafa Zamani) is an Iraqi math teacher who lost his family on the 29 March Baghdad bombings. Meanwhile, he detained and later imprisoned at the infamous Abu Ghraib prison for three years. Disguised as a woman, he plans to blow himself up at a restaurant on Christmas Day in 2009. There, he suddenly discovers a picture of himself on the wall, when Rebecca enters the restaurant. Shocked, Saleh runs away.

Cast
 Mazdak Mirabedini as Daniel Dalca
 Pantea Bahram as Rebecca
 Mostafa Zamani as Saleh Al Marzouk
 Cyrus Saidi Mosanen as Lt. Sean Miller
 Reza Mohammady as Cpl. Nick Wilson
 Majid Bahrami
 Arya Shakeri
 Adnan Shahtalai

See also
 List of submissions to the 83rd Academy Awards for Best Foreign Language Film

References

External links
 Farewell Baghdad Website

2010 films
2010 drama films
Iranian drama films
Persian-language films
Anti-war films about the Iraq War